Heinz Ostheimer (born 15 September 1931) is a German former gymnast. He competed in eight events at the 1952 Summer Olympics, representing Saar. He is the last surviving competitor of the Saar Olympic team.

See also
 Saar at the 1952 Summer Olympics

References

External links
 

1931 births
Living people
German male artistic gymnasts
Olympic gymnasts of Saar
Gymnasts at the 1952 Summer Olympics
People from Saarpfalz-Kreis
Sportspeople from Saarland